Carnivàle is an American television series that aired on HBO between 2003 and 2005. Created by Daniel Knauf, the show traces the disparate storylines of a young carnival worker named Ben Hawkins (played by Nick Stahl) and a preacher in California named Brother Justin Crowe (Clancy Brown) during the United States Dust Bowl. Although Carnivàle was praised for its production and art style, the unfolding story proved too inaccessible for the general audience and led to the show's cancellation after two of six planned seasons. The inaugural season of Carnivàle garnered numerous awards and nominations, including five Emmy Awards and two Emmy nominations in the creative arts categories. The second season received eight Emmy nominations. Nominations for two Golden Reel Awards, four Satellite Awards and two Saturn Awards did not result in a win. The only actor of Carnivàle's large main cast to win an award was Adrienne Barbeau ("Ruthie") with a WIN Award (Women's Image Network Awards). Overall, Carnivàle has received eleven awards from thirty-six nominations.

Costume Designers Guild Awards
Founded in 1999, the Costume Designers Guild Awards honors Costume Designers in Motion Pictures, Television, and Commercials. Carnivàle was nominated for a CDG twice, winning in 2003.

Emmy Awards
The Emmy is a television production award considered the television equivalent to the Academy Award. The inaugural season of Carnivàle received nominations for seven Emmys  in 2004, winning five in creative arts categories. The second season received eight further Emmy nominations in 2005 without a win.

Golden Reel Awards
The Golden Reel Award has been annually presented by the American Motion Picture Sound Editors since 1953, honoring motion picture and television sound editors and their soundtracks. Carnivàle was nominated for two Golden Reel Awards in 2003.

Satellite Awards
The Satellite Award, originally known as the Golden Satellite Award, is an annual award given by the International Press Academy.

Saturn Awards
The Saturn Award is an award presented annually by the Academy of Science Fiction, Fantasy & Horror Films to honor the top works in science fiction, fantasy, and horror in film, television, and home video. Carnivàle was nominated in two categories in 2004, but failed to win in either.

VES Awards
The Visual Effects Society represents the full breadth of visual effects practitioners in all areas of entertainment and honors film, television, commercials, music videos and video games with an award since 2002. Carnivàle won one of three nominations in 2003.

Other awards

References

External links
 List of awards on IMDb

Awards and nominations
Carnivale